Johann Christian Gerning (1745–1802) was a German banker, art collector, and entomologist.

Gerning lived in Frankfurt. His insect collection was given to Museum Wiesbaden in 1829 by his son Johann Isaak von Gerning. It is beautifully conserved and contains insects given to the Gerning family by Maria Sibylla Merian (1647-1717). Many entomologists worked on the collection and it contains the specimens they based species descriptions on (holotypes).He was a correspondent of the philosopher Johann Georg Hamann.

German entomologists
1745 births
1802 deaths
German bankers
German art collectors